Billy Murray (April 18, 1892 – March 4, 1926) was an American boxer in the early 20th century.

Boxing career
Although initially starting off rather weak, with 3 wins, 2 losses, and a draw, Murray had an incredible win streak afterwards.  He was undefeated his next 49 fights, against boxers such as Anton LaGrave, Johnny McCarthy, Jimmy Clabby, and many others.  However, he was defeated twice in a row by a boxer known as George Chip.  He won 2 more consecutive fights, and then lost the next 9 fights in a row.  He fought 24 more fights afterwards, bringing his record to 60 wins (45 by knockout), 16 losses, and 9 draws.

Place of birth missing
1892 births
1926 deaths
American male boxers